Escape: Human Cargo is a 1998 American action television film, directed by Simon Wincer. In 1999, the film was nominated at the Motion Picture Sound Editors for the Golden Reel Award in the Best Sound Editing - Television movies category. It lost to A Soldier's Sweetheart.

Plot
John McDonald, an American prefabricated housing entrepreneur, is working on a business deal in Saudi Arabia. The business deal goes awry and he's soon arrested by his business partner and made a virtual hostage within the Kingdom and does not receive any help from the U.S. embassy as they have a noninterference policy with the Saudi government. Fearing for the worst, McDonald crafts a plot to smuggle himself out in a wooden cargo box.

Cast
Treat Williams ... John McDonald
Stephen Lang ... Dennis McNatt
Sasson Gabai ... Suliman Nasir Rasi
Ze'ev Revach ... Sheik Abdulla Fazza
Rinan Haim ... Silent Sam
Uri Gavriel ... Khalid

References

External links

1998 films
Arabic-language films
Films set in Saudi Arabia
Films shot in Israel
American political drama films
Relativity Media films
1990s action drama films
Stowaways
Showtime (TV network) films
1998 drama films
Films directed by Simon Wincer
American drama television films
1990s English-language films
1990s American films